Long or Nong (also called Longmu 龙亩) is an unclassified Loloish language of Huaning County, Yunnan, China. It is also called Luowu 罗婺.

Classification
Pelkey (2011:431) suggests that the Xiqi, Ati, and Long languages of Huaning County may be Southeastern Loloish languages. Hsiu (2018) suggests a Northern Loloish affiliation.

Distribution
The Huaning County Gazetteer 华宁县志 (1994:514) lists the following locations of Nong within Xincheng Township 新城乡: Xincheng 新城, Longmu 龙亩, Kazhai 卡寨, Sheyingzhai 舍阴寨, Shemuduo 舍亩多, Suojugou 所居沟, Pusulu 普苏鲁.

Vocabulary
The Huaning County Ethnic Gazetteer (1992:72) provides a short word list of Adu, Ati, Xiqi, Nong, and Azhe transcribed using Chinese characters, shown below. Pinyin transliterations have also been provided below.

References

Loloish languages
Languages of China